Patay is a commune in the Loiret department in north-central France. Population: 2,190 (2017).

History
It was the site of the Battle of Patay on 18 June 1429.

See also
Communes of the Loiret department

References

Communes of Loiret